Wedge Records is a 1990s California record label specializing in punk rock/hardcore.  The label is most noted for releasing early AFI and Frantics records.

It was founded by Matt "Wedge" Wedgley of The Circus Tents, The Force, and Viva Hate.

See also
 List of record labels

External links
 Official website
 

American record labels
Punk record labels
Hardcore record labels